These are the Billboard Hot 100 number-one singles of 1973. The longest running number one single of 1973 is "Killing Me Softly With His Song" by Roberta Flack which stayed at the top spot for five non-consecutive weeks.

That year, 14 acts earned their first number one, such as Carly Simon, Elton John, The O'Jays, Vicki Lawrence, The Edgar Winter Group, Wings, Jim Croce, Maureen McGovern, Stories, Grand Funk, Gladys Knight & the Pips, and Charlie Rich. Jim Croce is the third person to hit number one posthumously after his death in September 1973. Eddie Kendricks and Ringo Starr, despite having hit number one with The Temptations and The Beatles, respectively, earn their first number one songs as solo acts. Stevie Wonder and Jim Croce were the only acts to hit number one with more than one song, each having two.

Chart history

Number-one artists

See also
1973 in music
List of Billboard number-one singles
Cashbox Top 100 number-one singles of 1973

Sources
Fred Bronson's Billboard Book of Number 1 Hits, 5th Edition
Joel Whitburn's Top Pop Singles 1955-2008, 12 Edition
Joel Whitburn Presents the Billboard Hot 100 Charts: The Seventies
Additional information obtained can be verified within Billboard's online archive services and print editions of the magazine.

References

1973 record charts
1973